Halit Deringör (17 July 1922 – 14 March 2018) was a Turkish footballer, who spent his entire playing career with Fenerbahçe in Turkey. His sportsmanship and passion for the game, made him one of the most iconic players in the history of the club.

Professional career
Deringör begun football as a child. He caught measles, and was kept indoors for 40 days with only a football to play with. He joined the Fenerbahçe  youth academy in 1937, and in 1942 joined the senior team. He only played for Fenerbahçe throughout his playing career, finishing his career with 67 goals in 193 games.

International career
Deringör represented the Turkey national football team 5 times, scoring twice. He made his debut for Turkey in a 3–1 friendly win over Greece on 23 April 1948. He scored his first goal in a friendly 6-1 win over Iran on 28 May 1950. He was also part of Turkey's squad for the football tournament at the 1948 Summer Olympics, but he did not play in any matches.

Personal life
After his playing career, Deringör became a sports writer and wrote articles for Cumhuriyet for 20 years. He died on 14 March 2018, at the age of 95.

Honours
Fenerbahçe
Turkish National Division: 1942–43, 1944–45, 1949–50
Istanbul Football League: 1943–44, 1946–47
Istanbul Football Cup: 1944–45, 1945–46
Prime Minister's Cup: 1944–45, 1945–46, 1949–50

References

External links
 
 

1922 births
2018 deaths
Footballers from Istanbul
Turkish footballers
Turkey international footballers
Footballers at the 1948 Summer Olympics
Turkish football managers
Fenerbahçe S.K. footballers
Süper Lig players
Association football forwards
Olympic footballers of Turkey